Held Up: Original Motion Picture Soundtrack is the soundtrack to Steve Rash's 2000 film Held Up. It was released on March 14 the same year through Spot Music Group, Inc. and consisted of hip hop and R&B music.

Track listing

References

External links

2000 soundtrack albums
Hip hop soundtracks
Albums produced by Fredwreck
Albums produced by Daz Dillinger
Gangsta rap soundtracks
Crime film soundtracks
Comedy film soundtracks